Imran Ali may refer to:

 Imran Ali (Kuwaiti cricketer), Kuwaiti international cricketer
 Imran Ali (cricketer, born 1983), Pakistani cricketer for Faisalabad and various other domestic teams
 Imran Ali (cricketer, born 1987), Pakistani cricketer for Pakistan International Airlines
 Imran Ali (cricketer, born 1994), Bangladeshi cricketer
 Imran Ali (Indian cricketer), Indian cricketer for Vidarbha and Central Zone

See also
Ali Imran (disambiguation)